The Garden Homes Historic District is a residential historic district located in the Chatham neighborhood of the South Side, Chicago, Illinois. The district includes 152 residential buildings, 88 of which are contributing buildings, built in 1919-20 as Chicago's first large housing project. The newly formed Chicago Housing Association, a group of 22 prominent Chicago businessmen that included J. Ogden Armour, Charles H. Wacker, and William Wrigley, Jr., planned the homes as an affordable housing project for working-class Chicagoans. At the time, the city was suffering from a post-World War I housing crisis, and many of its working-class residents lived in tenements or other unlivable housing. Architect Charles Sumner Frost designed the homes, which were mainly brick cottages and stucco duplexes. The houses were built on unusually large lots for the time; the extra land was designed to serve as garden space for residents.

The district was listed on the National Register of Historic Places on February 28, 2005.

See also
National Register of Historic Places listings in South Side Chicago

References

Historic districts in Chicago
South Side, Chicago
Houses on the National Register of Historic Places in Chicago
Historic districts on the National Register of Historic Places in Illinois